In Linux, and other Unix-like operating systems, the  directory holds files used in booting the operating system. The usage is standardized in the Filesystem Hierarchy Standard.

Contents
The contents are mostly Linux kernel files or boot loader files, depending on the boot loader, most commonly (on Linux) LILO or GRUB.

Linux
 vmlinux – the Linux kernel
 initrd.img – a temporary file system, used prior to loading the kernel
 System.map – a symbol lookup table

LILO
LILO creates and uses the following files:
 map – a key file, which records where files needed by LILO during boot are stored. Following kernel upgrades, this file must be regenerated by running the "map installer", which is  otherwise the system will not boot.

GRUB
GRUB stores its files in the subdirectory  (i.e. ).

Location
 is often simply a directory on the main (or only) hard drive partition. However, it may be a separate partition. A separate partition is generally only used when bootloaders are incapable of reading the main filesystem (e.g. LILO does not recognize XFS) or other problems not easily resolvable by users.

References

Linux kernel
Unix file system technology
System administration
File system directories